Michael Posner (born 1947) is a Canadian journalist, best known as the author of the Mordecai Richler biography The Last Honest Man, the Anne Murray biography All of Me, and The Art of Medicine: Healing and the Limits of Technology with the physician Dr. Herbert Ho Ping Kong. He is also the author of a three-volume oral biography of Leonard Cohen published by Simon and Schuster.  The first volume Leonard Cohen, Untold Stories: The Early Years was published in 2020. The second volume Leonard Cohen, Untold Stories: This Broken Hill was published in 2021, and the final volume, Leonard Cohen, Untold Stories: That's How the Light Gets In, will be published late 2022.

In his youth, he appeared as an actor in the film And No Birds Sing, for which he won the Canadian Film Award for Best Supporting Actor in a Non-Feature at the 21st Canadian Film Awards in 1969. He did not continue to work as an actor, instead becoming a journalist. In 1977, he co-founded Canadian Lawyer Magazine, and went on to write for publications such as the Financial Times of Canada, The Globe and Mail and Toronto Life. His books and long form journalistic works have included The Big Picture: What Canadians Think About Almost Everything (1990), cowritten with Allan Gregg; Canadian Dreams: The Making and Marketing of Independent Films (1993); and Triple Bypass (2016), about his 2013 battle with heart disease.

References

20th-century Canadian male actors
20th-century Canadian non-fiction writers
20th-century Canadian male writers
21st-century Canadian non-fiction writers
Canadian newspaper journalists
Canadian male journalists
Canadian magazine journalists
Canadian biographers
Canadian male film actors
Canadian Screen Award winners
Jewish Canadian male actors
The Globe and Mail people
Living people
1947 births
Jewish Canadian journalists
Male biographers